Daniel Thomas Carlisle (born December 14, 1955 in Houston, Texas) is a former American sports shooter and Olympic bronze medalist.  At the 1984 Summer Olympics in Los Angeles, California, he won a bronze medal in the men's trap competition.  At the 1988 Summer Olympics, he place 9th in the trap competition and 4th in the skeet competition.

References

 

1955 births
Living people
Sportspeople from Houston
American male sport shooters
United States Distinguished Marksman
Skeet shooters
Shooters at the 1984 Summer Olympics
Shooters at the 1988 Summer Olympics
Olympic bronze medalists for the United States in shooting
Medalists at the 1984 Summer Olympics
Pan American Games medalists in shooting
Pan American Games gold medalists for the United States
Shooters at the 1975 Pan American Games
Shooters at the 1983 Pan American Games
Shooters at the 1987 Pan American Games
20th-century American people
21st-century American people